The Sauber C36 is a Formula One racing car designed and constructed by Sauber to compete during the 2017 FIA Formula One World Championship. The car was driven by Marcus Ericsson and Pascal Wehrlein, who joined the team after Felipe Nasr left the team at the end of the  season. Antonio Giovinazzi drove the car in Wehrlein's place after a pre-season injury saw Wehrlein withdraw from the opening two rounds of the season as a precaution. The C36 made its competitive début at the 2017 Australian Grand Prix, and uses a 2016-specification Ferrari engine.

The chassis was designed by Jörg Zander, Eric Gandelin, and Nicolas Hennel with the car being powered with a customer Ferrari powertrain.

Design and development 
The C36 is the first Sauber built after the team's takeover by Longbow Finance S.A. Originally intended to be the last Sauber car to be fitted with Ferrari engines, after the team secured a deal to run with customer and up-to-date Honda powered engines for the  season, the deal to run with Honda powered engines was cancelled on 27 July 2017 and eventually secured another year of Ferrari engines for 2018.

The Sauber C36 used the Ferrari 061 as its power unit, as opposed to the 062 model which was developed by Ferrari for the 2017 season. When Ferrari made the decision to completely redesign the 061 model, Sauber had already started development of the C36, designing the chassis around the 061 and its predecessor, the 060, both of which had a similar shape. However, the 062 model that Ferrari created did not fit the C36 chassis; in particular, the chassis mounting points for the engine did not fit the 062 engine. Sauber chose to keep the 061 engine instead of completely redesigning the C36 around the 062 model, arguing that the performance gains offered by the 062 model were slight and that the renewed emphasis on aerodynamic grip in the 2017 technical regulations would offset any performance deficit between the 061 and 062 models.

Competition history

At the Spanish Grand Prix, Wehrlein finished in 7th but was relegated to 8th after receiving a 5-second penalty for failing to enter the pit lane in the correct manner. It was the first points finish of the season for the financially strained Sauber team.

Wehrlein scored another point at the extremely chaotic  Azerbaijan Grand Prix when he finished in 10th. This was also the team's first race after their team principal, Monisha Kaltenborn quit the team after 7 seasons, during the week of the Grand Prix.

On a low note, three races saw major crashes; all of them involved Wehrlein's car.  In  China, Antonio Giovinazzi, subbing for Wehrlein after the German's crash in the Race of Champions, crashed heavily twice exiting the final corner.  Wehrlein's race in Monaco ended on his side in the barriers at Portier when Jenson Button, subbing for Fernando Alonso while the Spaniard contested the Indianapolis 500, hit him trying to pass (both of their teammates would end their races in the barrier at Sainte Devote and engine issues ended Alonso's bid at Indianapolis), and a practice session in Hungary saw Wehrlein hit a barrier hard after catching an initial snap when his car got loose.

Complete Formula One results
(key) (results in bold indicate pole position; results in italics indicate fastest lap)

Notes
† – Driver failed to finish the race, but was classified as they had completed greater than 90% of the race distance.

References

C36
2017 Formula One season cars